Maly Kipchak (Bäläkäy Qıpsaq) is a rural locality (a village) in Kipchaksky Selsoviet, Burzyansky District, Bashkortostan, Russia. The population was 57 as of 2010. There are 2 streets.

Geography 
Maly Kipchak is located 49 km northeast of Starosubkhangulovo (the district's administrative centre) by road. Abdulmambetovo is the nearest rural locality.

References 

Rural localities in Burzyansky District